was a monthly seinen manga magazine published by Shogakukan. It tended to specialize in underground or alternative manga, but it had its share of major hits as well. The magazine started in 2000 as a spin-off of Shogakukan's Weekly Big Comic Spirits, titled Spirits Zōkan Ikki, published on a bimonthly basis, and became a standalone monthly magazine in 2003. In 2009, Viz Media launched an online English version of Monthly Ikki, named SigIkki, which serialized selected titles from the magazine. Ikki ceased publication after an almost 14-year-run in 2014, and was replaced by Hibana, which ran from 2015 to 2017, before ceasing its publication as well.

History

Editor  worked in the editorial department of Shogakukan's Weekly Big Comic Spirits for eighteen years. Egami realized that although the weekly manga magazine is the standard in Japan, manga was getting more sophisticated and he thought that some manga artists would do better as creators of monthly series rather than weeklies (mentioning Taiyō Matsumoto of Tekkonkinkreet fame as example), as weekly serialized creators tend to use many assistants and it is a very fast-paced work stream. On the other hand, he considered that monthly manga artists were more likely to do more of the work on their own or with very few people assisting them, taking time for a more thoughtful approach to create their stories. According to Egami, Matsumoto persuaded him to develop a new magazine.

Egami decided to create a monthly magazine, as a spin-off of Weekly Big Comic Spirits. When the magazine was about to be launched, there were obstacles, mostly trademark issues in coming up with a name for the magazine. Egami created an advertisement to devise a name from ideas submitted by readers, in exchange for a monetary reward, but Egami's boss rejected the plan. The magazine debuted with the title , and thirteen issues were released on a bimonthly basis from November 30, 2000, to December 25, 2002. Ikki then became a standalone monthly magazine and debuted with the April 2003 issue (released on February 25, 2003).

In 2009, Viz Media launched an online English version of Monthly Ikki, named SigIkki. According to Egami, the defunct American manga magazine Pulp "opened the way for Ikki to be accepted in America, that it was a gateway to manga for a lot of creatively minded people." Egami stated that the original pages of the magazine in Japan were digitized, and deciding how to use this material, the first thing he thought was on translating it in English to reach a wider audience. He further said: "[i]n the files themselves, the text and art are separated into different layers. So, it's easier to localize the series into another language. I'm totally counting on the English versions of the IKKI series, because English is now the "universal language." Many many more people will now be able to read IKKI comics." Leyla Aker, former Viz Media editorial manager, said that the project was jokingly referred to as "Pulp 2.0" in internal planning discussions. Aker said that the objectives of Ikki and their Viz Signature imprint were the same: "publish series that offer a diverse range of content but that are all marked by creative excellence." Monthly Ikki was also Shogakukan's first manga magazine to start doing manga in digital format. The website serialized various titles from Monthly Ikki online, and then, when a title proved to be popular it received publication in graphic novel form. It also included interviews with the Japanese creators and editors. In January 2013, Ikki Paradise, the official website of the magazine, launched the web manga corner , which serialized manga specifically made for the web for free to readers.

The September 2014 issue of Monthly Ikki (released on July 25, 2014) announced that the magazine would cease publication after an almost 14-year-run, finishing with the November 2014 issue (released on September 25, 2014). Some series, which were running in the magazine at the time, finished with the last issue, while others were transferred to other magazines. Hibana ceased publication after a two-year-run with the September 2017 issue (released on August 7, 2017).

Style

Monthly Ikki was considered an underground magazine and the kind of series which it featured was compared to the American/European alternative comics. The magazine mainly focused on the creativity of the authors rather that the expectation of the audience, as Egami stated: "[a]t the time we were founding IKKI, my boss told me that with Weekly Comic Spirits, we have to see the ocean for the sea, meaning that you have to see the audience or the readers' point of view. But for IKKI, you have to see the spring that is the origin of the river, meaning you have to see the creator and work with the creator; that it's important to understand the artists' point of view." Monthly Ikki advertised itself as a "comics magazine" instead of a "manga magazine" due to its different kind of manga.

Egami said that the slogan of the magazine was "[w]e are still at the dawn of the manga era," explaining: "[t]he spirit of this tagline is that the dawn is still approaching; meaning that if you assume that the history of manga will continue for 200 years or longer, we are still at the very beginning. Even though some people think that the manga market is saturated, that it is mature and sophisticated, we believe that there is still a lot more that can be done in the manga world." Egami further elaborated: "[w]hen I think about it like that, it almost seems as if only a really short period of time has elapsed in terms of the evolution of manga, that there will be more and more mangaka in the future who could be right up there next to Tezuka."

To recruit artists for the magazine, they looked for creators who worked for other magazines or publishers, and to look for new artists, they held a newcomers contest. Saturn Apartments author Hisae Iwaoka and I'll Give It My All... Tomorrows author Shunju Aono were artists discovered through the newcomers content.

Circulation and demographic
In 2009, the magazine had 13,750 copies in circulation; the numbers were dropping to 11,500 copies in circulation in 2010; 11,000 copies in circulation in 2011; 10,584 copies in circulation in 2012; and 10,000 copies in circulation in 2013. Egami himself admitted that the magazine did not sell very well in Japan. Some series from the magazine, like Bokurano: Ours and Rideback, received anime adaptations which helped to increase the tankōbon volume sales of those series, but did not affect that much the sales of the magazine itself.

Monthly Ikki was a seinen manga magazine, aimed at older teens and young adult readers; however, Egami stated that they were not trying to focus on the gender or age of their readers, unlike the majority of the manga industry, and the magazine was meant "for everybody." Egami said that most of their audience was in their twenties, and there also was a younger group of readers who ranged from older teens to an older audience, some who were up to 50's. According to Egami, 40% of Monthly Ikki'''s readers were female, something unusual for a seinen manga magazine, and regarding the teen readers, 60% were girls. Egami said that in every age, gender or group are people with creative minds who could understand the concepts and topics featured in their series, and Monthly Ikki was trying to reach that specific type of reader. He further explained: "[w]ith IKKI, I wanted to create something that belongs on that very top shelf inside of people. I wanted to make a magazine that stimulates the highest sentiments that a person could feel. It's not about gender or age group, because everyone has these feelings in them." Ikki, unlike other seinen manga magazines, did not use color nude photos on the issues cover, because according to Egami, it alienated female readers and it was not "the kind of nudity to begin with." Egami also stated that they were not intentionally trying to make series equally appealing to both men and women readers, and titles like House of Five Leaves, which was popular with female readers, "just happen[ed] to be popular with female readers."

Series featured in Ikki
Ongoing titles in the final issue

Previously serialized works

2000–04
  by Naoki Yamamoto (2000–2002)
 The Beetles by Atsushi Nobuzawa (original story) and Toshihiro Katagiri (art) (2000–2001)
  by Akira Sasō (2000–2001)
  by Yoko Nihonbashi (2000–2003)
  by Seiho Takizawa (2000–2002)
  by Ryo Nagata (2000–2002)
  by Sakuya Hikochi (2000–2002)
  by Nawoki Karasawa (2000–2003)
  by Taiyō Matsumoto (2000–2005)
  by Iou Kuroda (2000–2002)
  by Nakatani D. (2001–2003)
  by Jiro Matsumoto (2001–2009)
  by Yumi Unita (2001–2003)
  by Hirohiko Yokomi (story) and Naoe Kikuchi (art) (2001–2006)
  by Kazuo Hara (2002–2009)
  by George Asakura (2003–2006)
 Rideback by Tetsurō Kasahara (2003–2008)
  by Daisuke Igarashi (2003–2004)
  by Hiroko Matsuda (2003–2006)
  by Hideyasu Moto (2003–2009)
  by Rokuro Shinofusa (2003–2007)
  by Mohiro Kitoh (2003–2009)
  by Suzuki Matsuo (story) and Naoki Yamamoto (art) (2004)
  by Hisae Iwaoka (2004–2005)
  by Yukito Ayatsuji (story) and Noriko Sasaki (art) (2004–2006)

2005–09
 Swweeet by Kei Aoyama (2005–2006)
  by Daisuke Igarashi (2005–2011)
  by Tetsu Kasabe (2005–2006)
  by Natsume Ono (2005–2010)
  by Hisae Iwaoka (2005–2011)
  by Osamu Mizutani (original story) and Seiki Tsuchida (art) (2005–2009)
  by Wisut Ponnimit (2006–2010)
  by Kōichi Kiba (2006)
  by Kō Akita (2006–2009)
  by Natsuo Kirino (original story) and Den Ishida (art) (2006–2007)
  by Shunju Aono (2007–2012)
  by Masahiko Kikuni (2008–2010) — Moved from Weekly Young Sunday  by Puncho Kondoh (2009–2012)
  by Nanki Satō (story) and Akira Kiduki (art) (2009–2012)
 Wombs by Yumiko Shirai (2009–2010) — Continued publication via compiled tankōbon volumes
  by Hirohiko Yokomi (story) and Kanoko Hoashi (art) (2009–2013)
 Junkin' Gap Clash by Jinko Kobayashi (2009–2014)
  by Motoyuki Ōta (2009–2012)

2010–14
  by Ching Nakamura (2010–2012) — Moved from Kodansha's .
  by Michi Urushihara (2010–2014)
  by Mikio Igarashi (2010–2013)
  by Dowman Sayman (2010–2014)
  by Romeo Tanaka (original story) and Takuya Mitomi (art) (2011–2012)
  by Romeo Tanaka (original story) and Takuya Mitomi (art) (2012)
  by Ayako Noda (2012–2014)
  by Shunju Aono (2012–2013)Kūya Shōnin ga Ita'' by Taichi Yamada (original novel) and Hideki Arai (2013–14)

Explanatory notes

References

Further reading

External links
  
 
 

2003 establishments in Japan
2014 disestablishments in Japan
Defunct magazines published in Japan
Monthly manga magazines published in Japan
Magazines established in 2003
Magazines disestablished in 2014
Seinen manga magazines
Shogakukan magazines